"The Sweetest Love" is a song by American R&B singer Robin Thicke. The R&B ballad is the follow-up single to the moderately successful "Magic" and is the second official single from Something Else. The song was released to radio on September 9, 2008.

Charts
The single charted on various amounts of Billboard charts in late November/early December 2008 and peaked at #20 on Billboard's Hot R&B/Hip-Hop Songs. While successful on many other Billboard R&B charts, "The Sweetest Love" has not been successful on many mainstream or pop charts. For example, the single has only peaked at #5 on Billboard's Bubbling Under Hot 100 Singles Chart, (which would actually be equivalent to #105 if the Hot 100 singles went beyond 100 positions).

Chart positions

Year-end charts

Music video
The music video premiered on Yahoo! Music on November 13 and later was released on MTV's TRL. It shows Thicke playing the piano, and at bed with model Jessica White. It was directed by fashion photographer Marc Baptiste.

References

External links
 Robin Thicke - "The Sweetest Love" music video

2008 singles
Robin Thicke songs
Songs written by Robin Thicke
Contemporary R&B ballads
2008 songs
Interscope Records singles
Smooth jazz songs
2000s ballads
Vocal jazz songs